
Lesnewth is a civil parish and village in Cornwall, England, United Kingdom. It is about six miles east of Tintagel Head and two miles east of Boscastle.

The parish is bounded on the north by St Juliot (where the 2011 census population is included.), on the east by St Juliot and Davidstow, on the south by Davidstow, and on the west by Minster, Cornwall. It is a small sparsely populated parish set in farmland with only a few houses, farms and a church. Lesnewth manor is mentioned in the Domesday Survey of 1086, as Lisniwen. Lesnewth was also the name of one of ten ancient administrative shires of Cornwall: see Lesnewth (hundred).

Lesnewth lies within the Cornwall Area of Outstanding Natural Beauty (AONB).

Notable buildings
The oldest buildings of Lesnewth include the Church, the Rectory, the Mill and Penpol, the latter of which is believed to be the original farmhouse to the surrounding north facing valley side. These buildings date back over 400 years, although there is believed to have been settlement in this area and on the opposing side of the Valency Valley for over 1000 years. The Church of St Michael was in part rebuilt by J. P. St Aubyn about 1865 though the tower is mediaeval.

There is a Cornish cross in Lesnewth churchyard which consists of an ancient cross head mounted on a modern shaft.

Etymology
The name is of Cornish origin and means 'New Court' (that is a chieftain's estate): the 'Old Court' was at Helstone near Camelford (Hen-lis, -ton being a Saxon addition) once known as Helston-in-Trigg in distinction to Helston-in-Kerrier.

References

Further reading

 Maclean, John (1872–79) The Parochial and Family History of the Deanery of Trigg Minor. 3 vols. London: Nichols & Son

External links

Villages in Cornwall
Civil parishes in Cornwall
Manors in Cornwall